Glaucocharis rectifascialis is a moth in the family Crambidae. It was described by David E. Gaskin in 1988. It is found in India and China.

Subspecies
Glaucocharis rectifascialis rectifascialis (India: Khasi Hills)
Glaucocharis rectifascialis indicalis Gaskin in Wang, Gaskin & Sung, 1988 (India: Uttar Pradesh)
Glaucocharis rectifascialis shafferi Gaskin in Wang, Gaskin & Sung, 1988 (China: Sichuan)

References

Diptychophorini
Moths described in 1988